Cwmrhydyceirw is a village in the City and County of Swansea, south Wales.  The village is located about 1 mile north of Morriston town centre. It is home to the main campus of Morriston Hospital, Morriston Comprehensive School, and Cwmrhydyceirw Primary School.  The English translation of the name means "the valley of the stags' ford", which gave rise to the name of local pub "The Deer's Leap". However, the name of the village may be corrupted from its original, thought to have been "Cwmrhydycwrw" - a reference to the ale-like appearance of the local stream ("cwrw" meaning ale).

Literary references
Lucky Jim by Kingsley Amis makes brief reference to an academic text by the fictional Professor Haines of Swansea University on the topic of medieval Cwmrhydyceirw.

External links
Swansea Hospitals via Locallife
Morriston Hospital
Morriston Comprehensive School
Cwmrhydyceirw Primary School

Villages in Swansea